Interviews with Phil Ochs, alternatively known as Broadside Ballads, Vol. 11, is, as its title states, an interview with folksinger Phil Ochs conducted by Broadside Magazine around 1968 and released around eight years later, after Ochs' April 1976 suicide.  The audio is available as a digital download on iTunes.  A download or CD is also available from Smithsonian Folkways Recordings at http://www.folkways.si.edu/albumdetails.aspx?itemid=982

Track listing

Side one
An introduction and background of Ochs, focusing on the past.

Side two
A general frustration with America circa 1968.

Phil Ochs albums
Interview albums
1976 live albums